Amuarib is a rural locality (a selo) in Tlogobsky Selsoviet, Gunibsky District, Republic of Dagestan, Russia. The population was 34 as of 2010.

Geography 
Amuarib is located 45 km northwest of Gunib (the district's administrative centre) by road, on the Kudiyabor River. Malalazda and Shagalazda are the nearest rural localities.

References 

Rural localities in Gunibsky District